Joseph Saint-Rémy (1818–1856) was a Haitian historian. He is best known for his biography La Vie de Toussaint Louverture about the Haitian Revolution leader Toussaint L'Ouverture, and for his work Pétion et Haïti, about another Revolutionary figure, Alexandre Pétion. Born in Guadeloupe, Saint-Rémy emigrated to Haiti as a young child and grew up in Les Cayes before leaving for school in France.

Selected works 

 La Vie de Toussaint Louverture
 Pétion et Haïti
 Les Mémoires de Boirond-Tonnerre
 Les Mémoires deToussaint Louverture

References
 
 

1818 births
1856 deaths
Haitian male writers
19th-century Haitian historians
19th-century male writers